2021 Democratic Unionist Party leadership election may refer to:

 May 2021 Democratic Unionist Party leadership election, won by Edwin Poots
 June 2021 Democratic Unionist Party leadership election, won by Jeffrey Donaldson